Hilversum Media Park, previously called Hilversum NOS (1974–1989) and Hilversum Noord (1989–2013), is a railway station in the city of Hilversum, Netherlands. Opened on 25 September 1974, Hilversum Media Park is located on kilometre 27 of the Amsterdam–Zutphen railway, partly called the Gooilijn because of the region it runs through. The station is situated north of the city centre, serving the Media Park, where most Dutch television and radio broadcasters are located. The station has two platforms, which are connected through a covered footbridge. Before 1989, the station was named after the public broadcaster Nederlandse Omroep Stichting, more commonly referred to as NOS.

Train services
Nederlandse Spoorwegen operates the following services from the station (4 trains per hour):

Bus services

Note: Local bus route 2 (operated by Connexxion) serves the station indirectly; it has a bus stop Stephensonlaan, 3 minutes away (by walking) from the station.

Gallery

References

Railway stations in North Holland
Railway stations opened in 1974
Railway station Hilversum Media Park
1974 establishments in the Netherlands
Railway stations in the Netherlands opened in the 20th century